Kilvington is a hamlet and civil parish in Nottinghamshire, England.

Kilvington may also refer to:
Kilvington Girls' Grammar, an independent Baptist day school for girls in Ormond, Victoria, Australia
North Kilvington, a village and civil parish in the Hambleton district of North Yorkshire, England
South Kilvington, a village and civil parish in the Hambleton district of North Yorkshire, England

People with the surname
Patrick Kilvington (1922–1990), Australian artist
Richard Kilvington (c. 1305–1361), English scholastic philosopher at the University of Oxford